Selenium acid may refer to either of the following:

Selenious acid, H2SeO3
Selenic acid, H2SeO4
Hydroselenic acid, H2Se